Frank Baumann may refer to:

 Frank Baumann (baseball) (1933–2020), American baseball player
 Frank Baumann (footballer) (born 1975), German football player